Lech Majewski (pronounced , ‘Ma-yev-ski’) (born 30 August 1953) is a Polish film and theatre director, writer, poet, and painter.

Life and career

Born in Katowice, Poland, Majewski studied at the Academy of Fine Arts in Warsaw. In the 1970s, he then studied at the National Film School in Łódź, notably as a student of Wojciech Has, who taught Majewski directing. In the early 80s, after completing The Knight and as martial law was declared in Poland, Majewski emigrated to England and then to the United States, where he lived for most of the late Communist era.

Majewski is a dual U.S.-Polish citizen, and travels often between those and other countries.

He is a member of the American and European film academies and the Polish International PEN.

Majewski speaks fluent, and excellent, English, but often works with English-speaking natives on his script. That was the initial role that Julian Schnabel had on Basquiat, before Majewski abandoned the project and Schnabel took it over.

In 2006, the Museum of Modern Art in New York City hosted a retrospective of Majewski's work. This was their first ever full retrospective of a Polish filmmaker, and one of their only ever mid-career retrospectives. For that program, Majewski created the film eventually called Glass Lips, though initially it was known as Blood of a Poet.

Filmography
 Zwiastowanie (1978) 
 The Knight (Rycerz) (1980)
 The Flight of the Spruce Goose (Lot Świerkowej Gęsi) (1986)
  Prisoner of Rio (Więzień Rio) (1988), produced between England and Brazil, a fictionalized story of Ronnie Biggs, mastermind of The Great Train Robbery of 1963
 The Gospel According to Harry (Ewangelia według Harry'ego) (1992)
 Basquiat (developed project, eventually credited as co-writer and co-producer) (1996)
 The Roe's Room (Pokój Saren) (1998)
 Wypadek (1998)
 Wojaczek (aka Life Hurts) (1999)
 Angelus (2001)
 The Garden of Earthly Delights (2004)
 Glass Lips (2007) (feature film version of the Blood of a Poet installation (2006))
 The Mill and the Cross (2011)
 Field of Dogs (2014)
 Valley of the Gods (2019)

Sources
The original version of this article was an adaptation of Google’s machine-translation of this version (2007-02-15) of the German Wikipedia article :de:Lech Majewski.

External links
Personal home page

Photograph
another photograph
biography
Lech Majewski: Conjuring the Moving Image (Vancouver)
Lech Majewski: Conjuring the Moving Image (New York)
International Film Circuit, inc.
Film Series: Cigarettes and cinema
ŻAK Gallery - Blood of a Poet installation
The Reeler May 4 2006
Personal Polish Home Page
culture.pl
filmpolski.pl
Lech Majewski personal site
epoznan.pl

Living people
1953 births
People from Katowice
Polish film directors
Polish cinematographers
Polish screenwriters
Polish film producers
Academy of Fine Arts in Warsaw alumni